Heterophysa is a genus of moths of the family Noctuidae.

Species
 Heterophysa dumetorum (Geyer, [1834])

References
Natural History Museum Lepidoptera genus database
Heterophysa at funet

Hadeninae